David Albaugh De Armond (March 18, 1844 – November 23, 1909)  was a Democratic Representative representing Missouri's 12th congressional district from March 4, 1891 until March 3, 1893, and then Missouri's 6th congressional district from March 4, 1893 until dying in office in 1909.

He was born in Blair County, Pennsylvania, attended Lycoming College and moved to Davenport, Iowa in 1866; studied law; was admitted to the bar in 1867 and commenced practice in Davenport; moved to Missouri in 1869 and settled in Greenfield, Dade County, Missouri.

He was member of Missouri State Senate, 1879–1883; Missouri Supreme Court commissioner, 1884; judge of the twenty-second judicial circuit of Missouri, 1886–1890.

In Congress he was one of the managers appointed by the House of Representatives in 1905 to conduct the impeachment proceedings against Charles Swayne, judge of the United States District Court for the Northern District of Florida.

De Armond and his young grandson both died in a fire that destroyed his home in Butler, Missouri. He is buried in Oak Hill Cemetery.

See also

List of United States Congress members who died in office (1900–49)

References

External links

David A. De Armond, late a representative from Missouri, Memorial addresses delivered in the House of Representatives and Senate frontispiece 1910

1844 births
1909 deaths
Accidental deaths in Missouri
People from Blair County, Pennsylvania
Democratic Party Missouri state senators
People from Greenfield, Missouri
Lycoming College alumni
Politicians from Davenport, Iowa
Democratic Party members of the United States House of Representatives from Missouri
Deaths from fire in the United States
19th-century American politicians
People from Butler, Missouri